Stemodiopsis is a genus of flowering plants belonging to the family Linderniaceae.

Its native range is Tropical and Southern Africa.

Species
Species:

Stemodiopsis buchananii 
Stemodiopsis eylesii 
Stemodiopsis glandulosa 
Stemodiopsis linearis 
Stemodiopsis rivae 
Stemodiopsis ruandensis

References

Linderniaceae
Lamiales genera